Castelvieilh is a commune in the Hautes-Pyrénées department in south-western France.

Geography

Climate

Castelvieilh has a oceanic climate (Köppen climate classification Cfb) closely bordering on a humid subtropical climate (Cfa).

See also
Communes of the Hautes-Pyrénées department

References

Communes of Hautes-Pyrénées